The Peyret-Mauboussin PM XI was a French high-wing touring aircraft of the early 1930s.

Development
The PM XI was designed by Peyret-Mauboussin as a Salmson-engined two-seat touring and sporting aircraft of wooden construction, an enlarged and more powerful development of the single-seat Peyret-Mauboussin PM X. Two examples were built.

Operational history
Two PM.XIs were built in parallel. The airframe c/n 02 was finished first and first flew on 9 July 1930. It was registered as F-AJUL. c/n 01 F-AKFD was ordered by the French Service Technique.

In July F-AJUL took part in the Challenge International de Tourisme 1930 touring aircraft contest, piloted by Charles Fauvel, but damaged a landing gear in a compulsory landing. By November one was flying at their Orly base and the other was under test for its CoA at Villacoublay. F-AJUL was later flown by Rene Lefevre from Paris to Tananarive, Madagascar, between 1 and 14 December 1931. The total distance flown was 11,000 km at an average speed of 120 km/hour. The return trip in February 1933 took 8 days.

This aircraft is stored without wings at the Musee Castel-Mauboussin at Cuers-Pierrefeu airfield near Toulon in southern France, and can be viewed by prior permission.

Specifications

References
Notes

Bibliography

The Mauboussin M.11 Monoplane in Flight, January 15, 1932, p. 48

External links

Aviafrance

Peyret aircraft
Mauboussin aircraft
1930s French civil utility aircraft
High-wing aircraft
Single-engined tractor aircraft
Aircraft first flown in 1930